Diamond DA20 is a light aircraft.

DA20 may also refer to:

Dassault Falcon 20, a business jet 
ДA20 (DA20) class of ALCO RSD-1 diesel-electric locomotive